or  is a fjord in Alta Municipality in Troms og Finnmark county, Norway. The village of Kåfjord and the Kåfjord Church both lie along the northern coast of the fjord. The European route E06 highway follows the northern shoreline of the fjord. A bridge over Kåfjorden was built in 2013 to shorten the E6 highway route around the fjord.

The fjord was the anchorage of the German battleship Tirpitz for much of World War II, which was attacked by British midget submarines during Operation Source in 1943 and by aircraft during Operation Tungsten, Operation Mascot, Operation Goodwood and Operation Paravane in 1944.

See also
 List of Norwegian fjords

References

Fjords of Troms og Finnmark
Alta, Norway